Erdős, Erdos, or Erdoes is a Hungarian surname.

People with the surname include:
 Ágnes Erdős (born 1950), Hungarian politician
 Brad Erdos (born 1990), Canadian football player
 Éva Erdős (born 1964), Hungarian handball player
 József Erdős (born 1977), Hungarian entomologist
 Mary Callahan Erdoes (born 1967), American banker
 Paul Erdős (1913–1996), Hungarian mathematician
 Richárd Erdős (1881–1912), Jewish Hungarian bass opera singer, father of Richard Erdoes
 Richard Erdoes (1912–2008), Hungarian-Austrian born American artist
 Sándor Erdős (born 1947), Hungarian fencer
 Thomas Erdos (born 1965), Brazilian auto racing driver
 Todd Erdos (born 1973), American middle-relief pitcher
 Viktor Erdős (born 1987), Hungarian chess grandmaster

See also 
 Erdő
 Erdődy

Hungarian-language surnames